Skinner Saddle is a high, broad, snow-covered saddle between the northern part of Darley Hills and that portion of Churchill Mountains eastward of Mount Durnford. Mapped by the Northern Party of New Zealand Geological Survey Antarctic Expedition (NZGSAE) (1960–61) and named for D.N. Skinner, geologist with the party.

Mountain passes of Antarctica
Landforms of Oates Land